Love Without Mercy is the second studio album by American country music singer Lee Roy Parnell.  It was released in 1992 on Arista Records. The album includes the singles "The Rock", "What Kind of Fool Do You Think I Am", "Tender Moment" and "Love Without Mercy". The latter three all reached Top Ten on the Billboard country charts. "Back in My Arms Again" was also recorded & released as a single by Kenny Chesney in 1996 off of Me and You.

Track listing

Personnel
 Eddie Bayers - drums
 Barry Beckett - keyboards
 Richard Bennett - electric guitar
 Paul Franklin - steel guitar
 Sonny Garrish - steel guitar
 Gregory Gordon - background vocals
 Jimmy Hall - background vocals
 Chris Harris - background vocals
 John Barlow Jarvis - keyboards 
 John Jorgenson - electric guitar
 Tim Loftin - bass guitar
 Delbert McClinton - duet vocals on "Road Scholar"
 Terry McMillan - percussion
 Jonell Mosser - background vocals
 Lee Roy Parnell - electric guitar, slide guitar, lead vocals
 Don Potter - acoustic guitar
 Michael Rhodes - bass guitar
 Matt Rollings - keyboards
 Russell Smith - background vocals
 Harry Stinson - background vocals
 Dennis Wilson - background vocals
 Bob Wray - bass guitar
 Curtis Young - background vocals

Production
Producers: Barry Beckett, Scott Hendricks
Production Coordination: Ragena Warden
Mixing: Scott Hendricks, John Hurley
Engineering: Scott Hendricks, Chuck Johnson, Jim DeMain, Patrick Kelly
Mastering: Hank Williams

Chart performance

References

1992 albums
Lee Roy Parnell albums
Albums produced by Barry Beckett
Albums produced by Scott Hendricks
Arista Records albums